The Gulfcoast Wonder & Imagination Zone, referred to as G.WIZ or GWIZ, is a defunct science museum located in Sarasota, Florida neighboring the Sarasota Bay. The museum was in operation from August 2000 to September 2012. The museum was home to the Blivas Science & Technology Center.

History
The science museum began in December 1990 as a  room within the Florida West Coast Symphony building under the name Gulf Coast World of Science (GCWS). The nonprofit organization moved to a bigger location after it was awarded a 20 year lease with the Sarasota City Commission in January 1998. The location was the former Selby Public Library.

The building was originally home to Selby Public Library, after the library moved from the Chidsey Library, in 1976. The building was designed by Walter Netsch from Skidmore, Owings & Merrill and incorporated his "Field Theory" aesthetic. The library relocated its operations to downtown Sarasota in 1998. The building was then remodeled, GCWS renamed to Gulfcoast Wonder & Imagination Zone (GWIZ), and the new museum opened to the public on August 26, 2000.

Closure
The science museum closed to the general public on September 4, 2012 to make renovations. The renovations were planned to modernize the museum and to give the museum 10 zones that included themes of: geography, dinosaurs, Florida Gulf Coast, outer space, science and mathematics. 

GWIZ's website at the time announced renovations were coming and stated “We are working hard to bring you GWIZ 2.0!” However, the nonprofit organization was also in default to the city's lease. The lease of the building to GWIZ was officially terminated by the city on September 21, 2013. The building sat vacant until its demolition in 2019.

Demolition
A master plan of the redevelopment project for the Sarasota Bayfront area known as "The Bay" was approved by the Sarasota City Commission on September 6, 2018. The project's initial phase included demolishing the GWIZ building in place of a recreational pier as well as a pedestrian bridge over US 41. The building was demolished in May 2019.

References

Museums established in 1990
Defunct museums in Florida
2000 establishments in Florida
2013 disestablishments in Florida
Museums in Sarasota, Florida
Buildings and structures completed in 1976
Buildings and structures demolished in 2019